Zorlu is a Turkish surname. It may also refer to:

Zorlu, Borçka, village in Artvin, Turkey
Zorlu Center, multiple-use complex in Istanbul, Turkey
Zorlu Energy Wind Power Project, wind farm in Pakistan 
Zorlu Holding, Turkish company
Zorlu PSM, performing arts theatre and concert hall in Istanbul, Turkey